USS Resolute (AFDM-10), (formerly YFD-67), was a AFDM-3-class floating dry dock built in 1945 and operated by the United States Navy.

Construction and career 
YFD-67 was built by the Chicago Bridge and Iron Co., in Chicago, Illinois in 1945. She was delivered to the Navy on 1 January 1945 and commissioned later that year. The dry dock was later re-designated as AFDM-10 and given the name Resolute. 

In November 1984,  commenced her Selected Restricted Availability (SRA) docked in Resolute. On 25 January 1987,  began a SRA that included drydocking in Resolute at Norfolk.

Resolute dry docked Los Angeles-class submarines on 25 June 1995 and 12 April 1996.  was dry docked on 12 August 1996. Later that year on 12 December,  underwent repair work.

In December 2004, the dry dock was towed to the West Coast and sold to Todd-Pacific Shipyards. On 5 February 2014,  was repaired on board the former Resolute. In early January 2019,  was overhauled and refitted inside the dry dock. Other ships worked on include ,  and

Awards 

 Navy Meritorious Unit Commendation (2 awards) 
 Navy Battle "E" Ribbon (2 awards) 
 National Defense Service Medal (2 awards)

References

External links 
NavSource: AFDM-10
Naval Vessel Register: Resolute (AFDM-10)

World War II auxiliary ships of the United States
Cold War auxiliary ships of the United States
Floating drydocks of the United States Navy
1945 ships
Ships built in Chicago